Anna's Linens was an American retailer. It was based in Costa Mesa, California.

The company was founded in 1987 by Alan Gladstone, who named the store after his mother. The first location opened in Los Angeles, California. 

In 1993, the chain filed for bankruptcy due to the poor economy of southern California at the time. It emerged from bankruptcy in December 1994.

The stores were stocked with household items, with merchandise sold at discounts. Stores were usually 10,000 square feet in size. It had more than 250 stores in 19 states. 

In early 2012, it partnered with DDR Corp. to expand into Puerto Rico.

In 2015, the chain filed for Chapter 11 Bankruptcy with money owed to creditors in excess of 100 million dollars. Most locations closed, which allowed Five Below to expand into California with new stores opening at former Anna's locations in 2017. 

On August 27, 2015, 41 store leases were taken over at auction out of a debtor's sale by  National Stores Inc. 

Some former Anna's Linens stores in certain locations will be branded "Anna's Linens by Fallas" according to the intellectual property rights acquired by National Stores and will continue the basic Anna's Linens product offering.

A member of its rewards program was known as a "Fan of Anna's."

References

External links
Official website

Home decor retailers
Retail companies of the United States
Retail companies based in California
Companies based in Costa Mesa, California
American companies established in 1987
Retail companies established in 1987
Retail companies disestablished in 2015
1987 establishments in California
2015 disestablishments in California
American companies disestablished in 2015
Companies that filed for Chapter 11 bankruptcy in 1993
Companies that filed for Chapter 11 bankruptcy in 2015
Companies that filed for Chapter 11 bankruptcy in 2018